Janice McKenzie is an English actress. She has appeared in Coronation Street as Mrs Paton (2000), Family Affairs as Helen Cooper (1997-1999) and most famously as Gloria Weaver/Pollard in Emmerdale (2000-2003, 2004). She has since appeared in televised dramas such as Holby City (2005), The Royal (2006) and Doctors (2004; 2007). However, she has been most active in theatre throughout her career.

She trained at the Guildhall School of Music and Drama and has worked in theatres throughout the UK. She has also been a teacher of English and Drama.

References

External links

British soap opera actresses
Alumni of the Guildhall School of Music and Drama
Year of birth missing (living people)
Living people